Tajik vehicle registration plates are registration plates for vehicles registered in the country.

History 
For the first time, numbers on cars in Tajikistan appeared during the entry of Tajikistan into the USSR . From that time until 1996, Soviet-style license plates belonging to the Tajik SSR were used in the country .

In 1996, license plates of their own design were introduced in Tajikistan, made in the image and likeness of license plates of the Russian Federation .

In 2009-2010, new license plates began to be issued in Tajikistan, which differed markedly from the previous ones. At the same time, new types of numbers appeared, for example, for public transport and for vehicles of the Ministry of Internal Affairs.

In April 2014, license plates changed slightly - the size of the letters became equal to the size of the numbers, and a chip appeared under the TJ code.

Codes

Vehicle Registration Plates of the Tajik Soviet Socialist Republic 
For the first time, numbers on cars in Tajikistan appeared during the entry of Tajikistan into the USSR . From that time until 1996, Soviet-style license plates belonging to the Tajik SSR were used in the country .

Vehicle Registration Plates of Independent Tajikistan 

In 1996, license plates of their own design were introduced in Tajikistan, made in the image and likeness of license plates of the Russian Federation .

In 2009-2010, new license plates began to be issued in Tajikistan, which differed markedly from the previous ones. At the same time, new types of numbers appeared, for example, for public transport and for vehicles of the Ministry of Internal Affairs.

In April 2014, license plates changed slightly - the size of the letters became equal to the size of the numbers, and a chip appeared under the TJ code.

Private / Individual Vehicle registration plates

1996 Series 
The modern Russian number was taken as a sample of the first Tajik numbers with the only difference - in the window of regional affiliation, instead of the code "RUS" and the Russian flag, the letter combination "RT" was written in small letters, there was no flag.

2009/2014 Series 
The new license plates are significantly different from those previously issued. The flag of the Republic of Tajikistan and the car code "TJ" appeared on the registration plates, the region code was no longer written in a separate window, the elements of license plates were swapped.

As letters, as in the previous format, the letters of the Tajik Cyrillic alphabet are used , similar in spelling to Latin, namely: A, B, E, K, M, H, O, R, C, T, X. Since 2014 the numbers also use the Latin letters D, J, Z and Y.

The plate design is black characters on a white background. On the left, the state flag of the Republic of Tajikistan is applied, under which the car code “TJ” is written, followed by four digits, two smaller letters and two digits indicating the region of registration. A two-row license plate has also been developed, where four numbers are placed in the top row, and letters and the region code in the bottom row, however it has only been issued on trailers. Since 2014, the size of letters and numbers is the same.

License Plate Fonts 
The 1996 Series uses the registration plate font of the Russian standard.

The 2009 Series uses a mix of registration plate fonts. The numbers are of the Polish standard whereas the letters are of the Russian standard.

The 2014 Series uses the registration plate font of the Polish standard.

Legal Entity / Organizational Vehicle registration plates

1996 Series 

The series differs from the format of plates of private individuals in that the letter is placed after the numbers in the serial.

2009/2014 Series 

The plate design is black characters on a white background. The number of individuals differs from the format by the presence of only three digits at the beginning of the number. Since 2014, the size of letters and numbers is the same.

Trailer registration plates

1996 Series 
The 1996 series differs from the format of numbers of private individuals in that there was an extra letter after the numbers (A1111A 11)

2009/2014 Series 

The plate design is black characters on a white background; the sign is a square two-row. In the top row, the state flag of the Republic of Tajikistan is applied, under which the car code “TJ” is written, followed by two numbers of the registration region and two letters; the bottom row contains four digits. Since 2014, the appearance of the number has changed: now there are four digits in the top row, and two letters and two digits of the region in the bottom row, the size of letters and numbers is the same.

Motorcycle registration plates

1996 Series 
Almost identical to the corresponding Russian standard, only the region number is not written in a separate window, the combination "RT" is missing.

2009/2014 Series 

The plate design is black characters on a white background; the sign is a square two-row. In the top row, the state flag of the Republic of Tajikistan is applied, under which the car code “TJ” is written, followed by three digits; in the bottom row there is a letter and two numbers of the region of registration.

Public Transport registration plates

2009/2014 Series 
Public Transport registration plates began being issued in 2009.

The plate design is black characters on an orange background. The format of the number matches the format of individuals, only the letter combination "TT" is used as letters. Since 2014, the size of letters and numbers is the same.

Transit vehicle registration plates

1996 Series 
These are Identical to the old Russian transits, only the word "Tranzit" is written in Latin.

2009 Series 

Reminiscent of modern Russian transit numbers, but mirrored. On the left, in a separate window, information is applied in black on yellow in 2 rows: the top row is the registration region code and the combination “ TJ ”, the bottom row is the word “ tranzit ”. In the rest of the letter, four numbers and one more letter are applied in black and white. Since 2014, the appearance of the sign has changed slightly: the first letter has become the same size as the numbers, and the flag of Tajikistan has been drawn above the last letter. See notes.

NOTES 
Transit registration plates in Tajikistan are produced with no set standard and the manufacturer of the plates will make a simple but legal copy. Often printed on paper.

Other vehicle registration plates

This section will contain a table of special license plate types of Tajikistan. This is compiled from the 1996 and 2009/2014 formats.

References 
Majority of this page is translated from the Russian version of this article .

Tajikistan
Transport in Tajikistan